The construction of All Hallows Episcopal Church, also known as All Hallows, Snow Hill, located at 109 West Market Street in Snow Hill, Maryland was funded in 1748 by an act of the Maryland Colonial Assembly, which taxed tobacco for the church.  Completed in 1756, it is an unusually elaborate building for its time and place. All Hallows Parish is one of the original 30 Anglican parishes in the Province of Maryland.

All Hallows Episcopal Church was added to the National Register of Historic Places in 1979.

It is still an active parish in the Episcopal Diocese of Easton. The Rev. Kenneth Thom is its current Supply Priest.  The Rev. Charles Hatfield will be the Rector starting February 12, 2018.

References

External links
, including photo in 1988, at Maryland Historical Trust
 All Hallows Episcopal Church website

Churches on the National Register of Historic Places in Maryland
Episcopal church buildings in Maryland
Churches in Worcester County, Maryland
18th-century Episcopal church buildings
Georgian architecture in Maryland
National Register of Historic Places in Worcester County, Maryland